Valentine Nwabili (born 17 March 1987) is a Nigerian professional footballer who plays for Indian club FC Agniputhra as a left back.

Career
Nwabili played club football in Nigeria, Tunisia, France and Sudan for Sharks, Espérance, Le Havre, Enyimba, Al-Hilal, Niger Tornadoes, Abia Warriors and Ifeanyi Ubah  He joined Abia Warriors in March 2015.

In September 2022 he was playing for Indian club FC Agniputhra.

He earned two international caps for Nigeria in 2010.

References

1987 births
Living people
Nigerian footballers
Nigeria international footballers
Sharks F.C. players
Espérance Sportive de Tunis players
Le Havre AC players
Enyimba F.C. players
Al-Hilal Club (Omdurman) players
Niger Tornadoes F.C. players
Abia Warriors F.C. players
Ifeanyi Ubah F.C. players
Association football fullbacks
Nigerian expatriate footballers
Nigerian expatriate sportspeople in Tunisia
Expatriate footballers in Tunisia
Nigerian expatriate sportspeople in France
Expatriate footballers in France
Nigerian expatriate sportspeople in Sudan
Expatriate footballers in Sudan
Nigerian expatriate sportspeople in India
Expatriate footballers in India